Miller Narrows is a gap that Lytle Creek passes through just below its confluence with South Fork Lytle Creek in San Bernardino County, California.

References

Landforms of San Bernardino County, California